Whitemoor is an area of the City of Nottingham. It lies next to Old Basford to the north, New Basford and Hyson Green to the east, Aspley to the west and Beechdale to the south. There is a primary school in the area, Whitemoor Primary School. There is a local doctors surgery and pharmacy. Local amenities include a hairdresser, corner shops, takeaways and pub. Nottingham City Transport serves the area via the 54, 70, 71, 78 and 79 services.

References

Areas of Nottingham